is a railway station in the city of Nagano, Japan, operated by the private railway operating company Nagano Electric Railway.

Lines
Fuzokuchūgakumae Station is a station on the Nagano Electric Railway Nagano Line and is 7.0 kilometers from the terminus of the line at Nagano Station.

Station layout
The station consists of one ground-level side platform serving a single bi-directional track.

Adjacent stations

History
The station opened on 14 March 1985.
Fuzoku Nagano Junior High School requested Nagano Dentetsu to build an adjacent station, and the station opened in response to their request.

Passenger statistics
In fiscal 2016, the station was used by an average of 1073 passengers daily (boarding passengers only).

Surrounding area
Shinshu University Fuzoku Nagano Elementary School
Shinshu University Fuzoku Nagano Middle School
Shinshu University Department of Education Fuzoku Special Education School

See also
 List of railway stations in Japan

References

External links
 

Railway stations in Japan opened in 1985
Railway stations in Nagano (city)
Nagano Electric Railway